The following lists events that happened during 2012 in Uzbekistan.

Incumbents
President: Islam Karimov 
Prime Minister: Shavkat Mirziyoyev

Events

April
 April 3 - Tajikistan accuses Uzbekistan of imposing an economic blockade.

June
 June 29 - Uzbekistan quits the Russian-led Collective Security Treaty Organization.

References

 
Years of the 21st century in Uzbekistan
2010s in Uzbekistan
Uzbekistan
Uzbekistan